Crawford Lake Conservation Area is in Halton, Ontario, Canada.

Crawford Lake may also refer to:

Canada
Crawford Lake (Cochrane District), Ontario
Crawford Lake (Halton Region), Ontario
Crawford Lake (Parry Sound District), Ontario
Crawford Lake (Rainy River District), Ontario
Crawford Lake (Sudbury District), Ontario
Crawford Lake (Haultain Township), Ontario
Crawford Lake (Milner Township), Ontario

United States
Crawford Lake (Wright County, Minnesota)
Crawford Lake (Washington)

See also